Kaavilamma is a 1977 Indian Malayalam film, directed N. Sankaran Nair. The film stars Madhu, Jayan, Sheela and Jagathy Sreekumar in the lead roles. The film has musical score by G. Devarajan.

Cast
Madhu 
Jayan 
Sheela 
Jagathy Sreekumar 
Manavalan Joseph 
Pattom Sadan 
Sreelatha Namboothiri 
Bahadoor 
Mallika Sukumaran 
Vettoor Purushan

Soundtrack
The music was composed by G. Devarajan and the lyrics were written by O. N. V. Kurup.

References

External links
 

1977 films
1970s Malayalam-language films
Films directed by N. Sankaran Nair